WBGC (1240 AM) is a radio station broadcasting a Variety format. Licensed to Chipley, Florida, United States.  The station is currently owned by Jacquelyn Collier Pembroke.

The station began broadcasting in 1956. Its call letters reflected its local market: Bonifay, Graceville & Chipley.

References

External links

BGC
1956 establishments in Florida
Radio stations established in 1956